The Ulster Junior Club Hurling Championship is an annual hurling competition played between the best junior hurling clubs in the province of Ulster in Ireland. The series of games are organised by the Gaelic Athletic Association and are played during the winter months. Teams qualify for this competition by winning the Junior hurling championship in one of the counties of Ulster. The winners represent Ulster in the All-Ireland Junior Club Hurling Championship.

Teams

Qualification

Roll of Honour

List of Finals

See also
 Munster Junior Club Hurling Championship
 Leinster Junior Club Hurling Championship
 Connacht Junior Club Hurling Championship

References

3